André-ani (born Clément Henri Andreani; April 22, 1901 – April 3, 1953) was an American costume designer.

Biography
Clément Henri Andreani was the son of Italian immigrants Massimo Andreani and Angiolina Reali, who arrived in the United States in 1888. Orphaned at an early age and suffering from a spinal deformity, he was cared for by his aunt Quinta. Friends, noting his artistic abilities, helped him to take art classes in San Francisco.

At age 16 he began working for the Selectasine Serigraphics Company in San Francisco. He later made use of the screen printing skills he obtained there, printing designs directly onto fabric for costumes.

By the early 1920s, André-ani was teaching at the School of Costume Designing in Los Angeles. Hollywood socialite Peggy Hamilton helped promote his work in her newspaper columns and fashion shows.

In 1925 he was hired by MGM, taking the place of head designer Erté in dressing stars such as Joan Crawford and Greta Garbo. He went to work for Universal Pictures in 1928.

Filmography

 1925: Soul Mates
 1925: His Secretary
 1925: The Mystic
 1925: If Marriage Fails
 1926: Flesh and the Devil
 1926: The Fire Brigade
 1926: Exit Smiling
 1926: The Temptress
 1926: The Devil's Circus
 1926: Torrent
 1926: The Blackbird
 1926: Valencia
 1926: Tin Hats
 1926: The Flaming Forest
 1926: Upstage
 1926: Love's Blindness
 1926: War Paint
 1926: Bardelys the Magnificent
 1926: Blarney
 1926: The Gay Deceiver
 1926: The Waning Sex
 1926: The Boy Friend
 1926: Paris
 1926: Money Talks
 1926: Beverly of Graustark
 1926: The Exquisite Sinner
 1926: The Barrier
 1926: Monte Carlo
 1926: Dance Madness
 1927: Captain Salvation
 1927: The Red Mill
 1927: Becky
 1927: The Bugle Call
 1927: The Frontiersman
 1927: Tillie the Toiler
 1927: Annie Laurie
 1927: California
 1927: Rookies
 1927: Lovers
 1927: Slide, Kelly, Slide
 1927: Heaven on Earth
 1927: The Understanding Heart
 1927: The Demi-Bride
 1927: Women Love Diamonds
 1927: Altars of Desire
 1927: The Taxi Dancer
 1927: A Little Journey
 1928: The Crowd
 1928: The Wind
 1929: The Great Gabbo
 1930: The Boudoir Diplomat
 1930: The Cat Creeps
 1932: Money Talks
 1935: Vagabond Lady

References

External links
 

1901 births
1953 deaths
American costume designers
American people of Italian descent
People from Oakland, California